Ukrainian Socialist Party is a name of few parties of the 20th century.

Socialist Party of Ukraine, a social-democratic political party in Ukraine founded in 1991

Political parties in Ukraine